Toujan al-Faisal (born in 1948) is a human rights activist and a former TV journalist, who was Jordan's first female member of parliament.

Early life
Al-Faisal was born in 1948, and she is a Circassian.

Political career
Al-Faisal was elected to the Jordanian parliament when the 1993 elections were resumed after the repeal of martial law. She served as a member of the parliament from 1993 to 1997. In the following election, the government is said to have interfered to prevent her being reelected.

Alleged apostasy
In 1989, an apostasy case against Toujan al-Faisal was heard in the first instance sharia court of south Amman. Jordan has no apostasy law but the petitioners sought that she be declared an apostate, and divorced from her husband. The court eventually ruled that it had no jurisdiction in the matter. On appeal in 1990, the sharia court of appeal, which had agreed to hear the section of the petition relating to divorce on the grounds of alleged apostasy, found that there was no evidence of apostasy and dismissed the case.

Activism and arrest
On 6 March 2002, al-Faisal published an open letter to King Abullah II on the website of the Houston-based newspaper Arab Times, accusing the then Jordanian Prime Minister Ali Abu Ragheb of corruption. The letter was later reprinted in the Islamist weekly Al Sabil. She claimed that the recent doubling of the cost of government-mandated automobile insurance was intended to benefit the major insurance companies in Jordan (several of which were owned or partly owned by the Prime Minister himself).

She was arrested on 16 March. The State Security Court prosecutor freed her on bail on 27 March but she was arrested again two days later on the eve of a press conference she was about to hold at her home. On 16 May 2002, she was convicted by the State Security Court on charges of "tarnishing the Jordanian state", defamation of the judiciary, "uttering words" before another deemed to be "detrimental to his religious feeling", "publishing and broadcasting false information abroad which could be detrimental to the reputation of the state", and inciting "disturbances and killings." She was sentenced to 18 months imprisonment, the maximum sentence allowed on such charges. She was convicted under a law promulgated through a provisional royal decree two weeks after the 11 September 2001 attacks. The law not only expanded the definition of "terrorism" but also further restricted freedom of expression in Jordan. Amnesty International condemned the prison term imposed on her:

Toujan was reportedly maltreated in jail. This caused an outcry of human right groups within and outside Jordan.

In prison she went on hunger strike, during which she lost 12 kg (1 st 12 lb) in less than a month. On 26 June 2002, after 29 days of hunger strike, she was freed from prison by a special royal pardon. The royal pardon did not annul her conviction. Speaking to BBC News Online, she said she was determined to walk out of hospital on her daughter's arm. And she continued to state "I refused a wheelchair because I don't like the look, the attitude of weakness."

Attempt to rejoin parliament
The 20 May 2003 of the Elections Committee decided not to allow her to stand as a candidate in the parliamentary elections of 17 June 2003. Al-Faisal decided to file a request before the Kingdom's Court of First Instance; however, on 24 May 2003 the court delivered a judgment rejecting the request. Al-Faisal's application was rejected due to her previous conviction, on the grounds that she had previously committed a non-political offense.

The International Federation for Human Rights (FIDH) considered that the Elections Committee and the Court decisions were based on an unfair condemnation, and Amnesty International stated that "Toujan al-Faisal is being denied her right to stand for elections on account of an unfair trial for expressing non-violent political beliefs."

References

Further reading
Nancy Gallagher, "Women's Human Rights on Trial in Jordan: The Triumph of Toujan al-Faisal," in Mahnaz Afkhami, ed. Faith and Freedom: Women's Human Rights in the Muslim World (London: I.B. Tauris, 1995) pp. 209–231.

External links
Toujan al Faisal, the case, her writings, and her news
Toujan al-Faisal talk (mp3)

1948 births
Living people
Members of the House of Representatives (Jordan)
Jordanian people of Circassian descent
Jordanian activists
Jordanian women activists
Jordanian prisoners and detainees
Prisoners and detainees of Jordan
Recipients of Jordanian royal pardons
20th-century Jordanian women politicians
20th-century Jordanian politicians
20th-century women politicians